Nathaniel Mackey is an American poet, novelist, anthologist, literary critic and editor. He is the Reynolds Price Professor of Creative Writing at Duke University and a Chancellor of The Academy of American Poets. Mackey is currently teaching a poetry workshop at Duke University.

He has been editor and publisher of Hambone since 1982 and he won the National Book Award for Poetry in 2006. In 2014, he was awarded the Ruth Lilly Poetry Prize, and in 2015 he won Yale's Bollingen Prize for American Poetry.

Biography
Nathaniel Mackey was born in 1947 in Miami, Florida and moved to California at age three when his parents split. As a teen, he started listening to jazz at his brother's suggestion, which later influenced his work. He visited Princeton University as a high school student along with Gene Washington where he was able to see live jazz in Manhattan. The trip was instrumental in the decision to attend the university. After he graduated with a BA, he returned to Southern California to teach algebra at a junior high school.

In 1970, Mackey enrolled in Stanford University for his doctorate. His dissertation was about the Black Mountain poets and the poetry they created with the human rhythms of breath and utterance. After graduation, he taught at University of Wisconsin and the University of Southern California before moving on to the literature department at the University of California, Santa Cruz in 1979. He held that position until 2010 when he moved with his family to North Carolina to take a position at Duke University.

Poetry
Mackey's books of poetry include the chapbooks Four for Trane (1978) and Septet for the End of Time (1983); and the books Eroding Witness (1985), School of Udhra (1993), Whatsaid Serif (1998), Splay Anthem (2006), Nod House (2011), and Blue Fasa (2016), as well as the books Tej Bet, So's Notice, and Nerve Church, which were published together as a boxed set called Double Trio in 2021. In 2016, Black Ocean Books published a collection called Lay Ghost that featured songs that later appeared in So's Notice.

Mackey's poetry combines African mythology, African-American musical traditions, and Modernist poetic experiment. His several ongoing serial projects explore the relationship of poetry and historical memory, as well as the ritual power of poetry and song.

Fiction
Mackey has published five volumes of an ongoing prose project entitled From A Broken Bottle Traces of Perfume Still Emanate. The books are titled Bedouin Hornbook (1986), Djbot Baghostus's Run (1993), Atet A. D. (2001), Bass Cathedral (2008), and Late Arcade (2017).

Bedouin Hornbook was inspired by the experience of seeing a jazz ensemble in which he was the only person in the audience. His series of letters explores playing in a band like that. The book is also the first in the “Broken Bottle” series.

Criticism and editing
In 1974, Mackey became an editor of the poetry journal Hambone, later becoming the sole editor and publisher in 1982.

Mackey is the author of Discrepant Engagement: Dissonance, Cross-Culturality, and Experimental Writing (1993), an influential book of literary theory, and more recently of Paracritical Hinge: Essays, Talks, Notes, Interviews (2004). He co-edited Moment's Notice: Jazz in Poetry and Prose  with Art Lange (1993).

Personal life 
At Stanford, Mackey met Gloria Jean Watkins (bell hooks), whom he dated until the mid 1980s. He married Pascale Gaitet, a specialist in French literature, in 1991. The couple later had three children: Naima, Gabriella, and Ian.

In 1999, he was diagnosed with sarcoidosis after a cut on his forehead didn't heal.

Awards
 1993 Whiting Award
 2006 National Book Award, Poetry, for Splay Anthem
 2007 Foundation for Contemporary Arts Grants to Artists Award
 2010 Guggenheim Fellowship
 2014 Ruth Lilly Poetry Prize
 2015 Bollingen Prize for American Poetry 
 2016 Bobbitt National Prize for Poetry for Lifetime Achievement

Resources

External links

 The Ocean’s Tide: Parentheses in Kamau Brathwaite’s and Nathaniel Mackey’s Decolonial Poetics at Cordite Poetry Review
 Mackey's page at The Academy of American Poets
 Mackey's EPC author page
 Groovedigit's Mackey page
Profile at The Whiting Foundation
 Author Page at Internationales Literatufestival Berlin Mackey was a Guest of the ILB ( Internationales Literatufestival Berlin / Germany   ) in 2005 
 "Add-Verse" a poetry-photo-video project Mackey participated in
Stuart A. Rose Manuscript, Archives, and Rare Book Library, Emory University: Nathaniel Mackey papers, 1947-2011

1947 births
Living people
African-American novelists
National Book Award winners
American male novelists
American male poets
American literary critics
People from Miami
African-American poets
21st-century African-American people
20th-century African-American people